Thorndon Hall is a Georgian Palladian country house within Thorndon Park, Ingrave, Essex, England, approximately two miles south of Brentwood and   from central London.

The garden is designed by Capability Brown.

Thorndon Hall is Grade-I listed with English Heritage, and the park is Grade II*-listed.

Old Thorndon Hall
The estate of Thorndon Hall, known previously as the manor of West Horndon, can trace its records back to the 1086 Domesday Survey commissioned by William the Conqueror. However, a building on the site of Old Thorndon Hall was first recorded in 1414 when King Henry V of England gave licence for its new owner, a merchant from South Wales called Lewis John, to "empark , to surround his lodge within this park with walls and to crenellate and embattle the lodge". The current house replaced Old Thorndon Hall which was located about a mile to the south in what is now known as "ruin wood" next to Old Hall pond. The old hall was damaged by fire in the early 18th century and was subsequently pulled down after being used briefly as farm buildings.

Present house
The present house was designed by the fashionable neoclassical architect James Paine and construction started in 1764. The portico of the present house was originally commissioned and imported from Italy in 1742 for use on the old hall which had been remodelled by Giacomo Leoni in the Palladian style. Following the fire at the Old Hall, it was kept, and reused in the design of the present house.

The estate and newly finished house was visited in 1778 by King George III and Queen Charlotte on their visit to see the troops at nearby Warley Common.

Following a fire in 1878, much of the main house and west wing were gutted leaving a shell and destroying or damaging many of the Petre picture collection. The surviving east wing was adapted into partial residential use with plans to renovate the house back to its original grandeur. However Petre family finances were in a poor state after the Great War and in 1920 the house and a portion of the estate was leased to Thorndon Park Golf Club. Originally, the company had planned to develop the estate into a luxury housing development and golf course, much the same as the Wentworth Club and St. George's Hill in Surrey, but with the introduction of London green belt legislation limiting house building on farm and parkland, the plan could not go ahead and the company folded.

Garden

The park was landscaped between 1766 and 1772 by Lancelot 'Capability' Brown at a cost of £5,000, much of which still survives, albeit merged into the landscaping of Thorndon Park Golf Course. The main driveway extended from what is now Shenfield Common for nearly two miles southwards to the northern face of the house. It can still be traced with maps, although it is now made up of public country parks and golf courses.

The first recorded camellia  – a cousin of the tea plant, camellia sinensis – to grow in Great Britain was at Thorndon Hall in the 1730s. Fifteen years later, the camellia was thriving around the country, and by the 19th century country houses were adding camelia houses just to grow the pink flowers.

Recent years
Eventually the golf club acquired the house and grounds, but chose to move out of the main hall and construct its purpose-built clubhouse within the grounds. In 1976, Thorndon Hall was sold to a developer, Thomas Bates & Son, Romford, who converted the mansion sympathetically to luxury apartments and cottages in landscaped surroundings, woodlands and parkland.  Parts of the former park had been sold off during the twentieth century for development on the outskirts of Brentwood. Essex County Council manages extensive areas as the public Thorndon Country Park. The nearby Petre family mortuary chapel is now owned by the Historic Chapels Trust.

Nearest places
 Brentwood
 Ingrave
 East Horndon
 West Horndon
 Bulphan
 Warley
 Laindon

References

External links

Photos of Thorndon Hall and surrounding area on geograph
Thorndon Park Golf Club website

 

Buildings and structures in the Borough of Brentwood
Gardens by Capability Brown
Grade I listed buildings in Essex
Grade I listed houses
Grade II* listed parks and gardens in Essex
Palladian architecture
Petre family